Wild Dreams is the third solo release by Joyce Yang. "Basing her recital around dream and night, Joyce Yang puts unlike alongside unlike in a dream-like sequence, one where ‘impulse trumps logic’, as she describes it."

Track listing

Sergey Rachmaninov
Dreams (Arr. Earl Wild), Op. 38/5 – 3:25	
Vocalise (Arr. Earl Wild), Op. 34/14 – 7:12

In einer Nacht, Op. 15 by Paul Hindemith
Müdigkeiten – 1:35	
Sehr langsam – 1:22	
Sehr lebhaft, flimmernd – 0:52	
Nervosität, nicht schnell – 0:54	
Scherzo: Äußerst lebhaft – 1:04

Out of Doors, Sz 81, BB 89 by Béla Bartók
With drums and pipes – 1:45		
Barcarolla – 2:56	
Musettes – 3:37	
The night's music – 5:29	
The chase – 2:13

Fantasiestücke, Op. 12 by Robert Schumann
Des abends – 3:07
Aufschwung – 3:11
Warum? – 2:36
Grillen – 3:05
In der nacht – 4:01
Fabel – 2:58
Traumes wirren – 2:33
Ende vom Lied – 4:58

Piano Sonata No. 2 in B flat minor, Op. 36 by Sergey Rachmaninov
Allegro agitato 8:01	
Non allegro. Lento 6:00
Allegro molto 5:41

The Little Island, Op. 14, No. 2
by Sergey Rachmaninov (Arr. Earl Wild)

Personnel
 Joyce Yang: piano

Production
Béla Bartók – composer
Dennis Collins	– liner note translation
Georgina Curtis – design
Mark Donahue – engineer
Paul Hindemith	– composer
Kt Kim	Cover – photo, photography
Andreas Klatt – liner note translation
Jeremy Nicholas – liner notes
Elizabeth Ostrow – producer
Sergey Rachmaninov – composer
Robert Schumann – composer
Dirk Sobotka – editing, mastering
Earl Wild – transcription
Joyce Yang – liner notes, piano, primary artist

References

2014 albums